is a passenger railway station located in the city of Narita, Chiba Prefecture Japan, operated by the private railway company, Keisei Electric Railway.
It is within walking distance of the JR East Narita Station.

Lines
Keisei Narita Station is served by the Keisei Main Line and Keisei Higashi-Narita Line. It is 61.2 kilometers from the Tokyo terminus of the Keisei Main Line at Keisei Ueno Station.

Station layout
The station consists of two island platforms and one side platform connected by underpasses. The elevated station building is adjacent to the side platform.

Platforms

History
It was renamed Keisei Narita on 18 November 1931.

Station numbering was introduced to all Keisei Line stations on 17 July 2010; Keisei Narita Station was assigned station number KS40.

Passenger statistics
In fiscal 2019, the station was used by an average of 36,905 passengers daily (boarding passengers only).

Surrounding area
 Narita Station (JR East Narita Line)
 Narita-san
 Narita City Hall

See also
 List of railway stations in Japan

References

External links

 Keisei Station layout 

Railway stations in Chiba Prefecture
Railway stations in Narita, Chiba
Keisei Main Line
Railway stations in Japan opened in 1930